All Hell Breaks Loose may refer to:

 All Hell Breaks Loose (Black Star Riders album), an album by Black Star Riders
 All Hell Breaks Loose (Destruction album), an album by Destruction 
 "All Hell Breaks Loose" (Charmed), the final episode of the third season of the TV series Charmed
 "All Hell Breaks Loose" (Supernatural), a two-part episode of the TV series Supernatural
 "All Hell Breaks Loose", a song by The Misfits from the album Walk Among Us
South Park: All Hell Breaks Loose, the original name for the film South Park: Bigger, Longer & Uncut

See also 
 All Hell Broke Loose, a 1995 Israeli documentary
 Hell Breaks Loose